Kuzminka is the name of several rural localities in Russia:

Kuzminka, Altai Krai
Kuzminka, Buzdyaksky District, Republic of Bashkortostan
Kuzminka, Chishminsky District, Republic of Bashkortostan
Kuzminka, Perm Krai
Kuzminka, Volgograd Oblast
Kuzminka, Belozersky District, Vologda Oblast
Kuzminka, Kaduysky District, Vologda Oblast
Kuzminka, Vytegorsky District, Vologda Oblast